The 2015 Lale Cup was a professional tennis tournament played on outdoor hard courts. It was the third edition of the tournament and part of the 2015 ITF Women's Circuit, offering a total of $50,000 in prize money. It took place in Istanbul, Turkey, on 20–26 April 2015.

Singles main draw entrants

Seeds 

 1 Rankings as of 13 April 2015

Other entrants 
The following players received wildcards into the singles main draw:
  Ayla Aksu
  Başak Eraydın
  Melis Sezer
  İpek Soylu

The following players received entry from the qualifying draw:
  Jana Fett
  Adrijana Lekaj
  Valeria Savinykh
  Nina Zander

Champions

Singles

 Shahar Pe'er def.  Kristýna Plíšková, 1–6, 7–6(7–4), 7–5

Doubles

 Lyudmyla Kichenok  /  Nadiia Kichenok def.  Valentyna Ivakhnenko /  Polina Monova, 6–4, 6–3

External links 
 2015 Lale Cup at ITFtennis.com

2015 ITF Women's Circuit
2015
2015 in Turkish tennis
2015 in Turkish women's sport